Jon Wright is a Northern Irish writer and film director.

Career
He is known for directing the Irish monster movie Grabbers and the British low budget horror comedy Tormented starring Alex Pettyfer. He directed and co-wrote the science fiction adventure film Robot Overlords starring Ben Kingsley. He has co-wrote and directed Unwelcome, an fantasy horror film, released in January 2023. Wright was inspired by the Grimm fairytales and stories from his own Irish grandfather. Wright described it as a "home invasion movie" and pitched it as "Gremlins meets Straw Dogs". The film uses many of the same production members as his previous film Grabbers.

References

External links
Jon Wright, Film Director - Official Site

Film directors from Northern Ireland
Horror film directors
Science fiction film directors
Living people
1971 births